Allright on the Night is the fourth album by the British hard rock band Tucky Buzzard. It was released on Deep Purple's record label "Purple Records", and was produced by The Rolling Stones' bass player Bill Wyman. The album artwork is a picture of vocalist Jimmy Henderson sitting in front of a painted pub wall.

Track listing

Songwriting credits are per BMI records. Credits on the album itself do not differentiate between Terry Taylor and Ron Taylor, and also give inconsistent credits for "Rainbow Rider" (the sleeve gives "Taylor/Henderson", but the record label gives "Taylor/Henderson/Brown").

Personnel
Tucky Buzzard
Jimmy Henderson - lead vocals, Blues harp
Terry Taylor - lead, slide, rhythm, and acoustic guitars
David Brown - bass, acoustic guitar
Chris Johnson - drums, percussion
Ron Taylor - guitar

Special thanks to
Paul Kendrick - rhythm guitar
Jeff Workman - piano
Phil Cordell - piano, assistant producer
Don Weller - brass
Bob Patterson - "Beer, fags & moans"
Tony Whibley - outer sleeve photography
Alex Marshall - artwork
Mick Rock - photography
Jeremy Gee - engineer
Robin Thompson - remix engineer

All songs recorded by Buzz Music Ltd. and Almo Music, Inc. (ASCAP)

A product of Purple Records, Ltd. (UK)

References

Tucky Buzzard albums
1973 albums
Purple Records albums